Conejo is a Spanish language surname from the Spanish word for rabbit. Notable people with the name include:
 Abel Conejo (1998), Spanish footballer
 Antonio García Conejo (1971), Mexican politician
 Gabelo Conejo (1960), Costa Rican former professional footballer
 Silvano Aureoles Conejo (1965), Mexican politician

See also 
Coello (disambiguation), a Galician-language variant
Conill (disambiguation), a Catalan-language variant
Coelho, a Portuguese-language variant

References 

Spanish-language surnames
Surnames from nicknames